Williamsburg Premium Outlets, formerly Prime Outlets and Berkeley Commons, is an outlet shopping complex located in Williamsburg, Virginia. It was built in 1988 by McArthur/Glen Group of Washington, D.C. The shopping center has 135 stores, and it is owned and operated by the Simon Property Group. The mall was renovated in 2008.

References

External links
 Premiumoutlets.com

Premium Outlets
Shopping malls in Virginia
Tourist attractions in Williamsburg, Virginia
Outlet malls in the United States
Shopping malls established in 1988